

Euryapsida is a polyphyletic (unnatural, as the various members are not closely related) group of sauropsids that are distinguished by a single temporal fenestra, an opening behind the orbit, under which the post-orbital and squamosal bones articulate. They are different from Synapsida, which also have a single opening behind the orbit, by the placement of the fenestra. In synapsids, this opening is below the articulation of the post-orbital and squamosal bones. It is now commonly believed that euryapsids are in fact diapsids (which have two fenestrae behind the orbit) that lost the lower temporal fenestra. There are probably no surviving descendants of the euryapsids.

The term Enaliosauria was once used for ichthyosaurs and plesiosaurs combined as well.

See also
 Anapsida
 Diapsida
 Synapsida

References

Polyphyletic groups
Prehistoric marine reptiles
Prehistoric reptile taxonomy